Dehnow-ye Sadat-e Vosta (also Romanized as Dehnow-ye Sādāt-e Vosţá; also known as Deh Now, Deh Now-e Bālā, Deh Now-ye Sādāt-e Mīānī, and Deh Now-ye Sādāt Khalīfeh) is a village in Rostam-e Do Rural District, in the Central District of Rostam County, Fars Province, Iran. At the 2006 census, its population was 24, in 6 families.

References 

Populated places in Rostam County